Eoneustes (meaning "dawn swimmer") is an extinct genus of metriorhynchoid crocodyliform from Middle Jurassic (late Bajocian to early Bathonian stage) deposits of France. Eoneustes was a carnivore that lived in the oceans and spent much, if not all, its life out at sea.

Discovery and species
E. bathonicus: Western Europe (France) of the Middle Jurassic (early Bathonian). It is known from holotype from Calvados of Normandy, that lost during the Second World War.
E. gaudryi: Western Europe (France) of the Middle Jurassic (late Bajocian to early Bathonian). It is known from the holotype NHM R.3353, a partial skull from Côte d’Or, Burgundy and the referred specimen from which housed at Université Claude Bernard Lyon I, F.S.L. 330210, another partial skull from Alpes-de-Haute-Provence, France.

References

Middle Jurassic crocodylomorphs
Prehistoric pseudosuchian genera
Prehistoric marine crocodylomorphs
Fossil taxa described in 2010
Middle Jurassic reptiles of Europe
Thalattosuchians